The 1996 congressional elections in New Hampshire were held on November 5, 1996 to determine who will represent the state of New Hampshire in the United States House of Representatives.  It coincided with the state's senatorial elections. Representatives are elected for two-year terms; those elected served in the 105th Congress from January 1997 until January 1999.  New Hampshire has two seats in the House, apportioned according to the 1990 United States Census.

Overview

1996
New Hampshire
1996 New Hampshire elections